Dimorphopalpa lyonsae is a species of moth of the family Tortricidae. It is found in Ecuador.

The wingspan is 14.5–16 mm for males and about 19 mm for females. The ground colour of the forewings is pale brownish cream, sprinkled with white in the distal part of the median cell and subterminally. The hindwings are pale brown, but paler basally in males and brown in females.

Etymology
The species is named in honour of Dr. Jane Lyons.

References

Moths described in 2007
Euliini
Moths of South America
Taxa named by Józef Razowski